{{Speciesbox
| status = CR
| status_system = IUCN3.1
| status_ref = <ref name="iucn status 24 May 2022">{{cite iucn |author=Canteiro, C. |author2=Lucas, E. |date=2018 |title= Myrcia portoricensis. The IUCN Red List of Threatened Species 2018 |volume=2018 |page=e.T113043713A113050426 |doi=10.2305/IUCN.UK.2018-2.RLTS.T113043713A113050426.en |access-date=24 May 2022}}</ref>
| genus = Myrcia 
| species = portoricensis
| authority = (Britt.) Cedeño-Mald. & Breckon ex F.S.Axelrod
| synonyms = 
 Calyptranthes portoricensis Britt.
 Myrcia maricaensis Alain
}}Myrcia portoricensis'' is a species of plant in the family Myrtaceae. It is endemic to Puerto Rico.

References

portoricensis
Endemic flora of Puerto Rico
Endangered plants
Taxonomy articles created by Polbot